Bethlehem Lutheran Church may refer to:

United States

Bethlehem Lutheran Church (Aitkin, Minnesota)

Bethlehem Lutheran Church (Round Top, Texas)

Other countries
Bethlehem Lutheran Church, Adelaide, in Flinders Street, Adelaide, South Australia